Abraham Moles (19 August 1920 – 22 May 1992) was a pioneer in information science and communication studies in France, He was a professor at Ulm school of design and University of Strasbourg. He is known for his work on kitsch.

Biography 
Moles studied electrical and acoustics engineering at the University of Grenoble while preparing a bachelor in sciences of nature. He became a research assistant at the Laboratory of metal physics, under the direction of Félix Esclangon, then of Louis Néel. There he learned techniques of metal work, then electric and electronic tools. He wrote reports on material properties or technical analysis. At the end of the Second World War, he was hired by the French National Centre for Scientific Research in the Laboratory of acoustics and vibrations of Marseille, and at the CRSIM (Centre de recherche scientifique industriel et maritime).

In 1952, he obtained a PhD in physics for a thesis titled 'La structure physique du signal musical et phonétique' (under the direction of René Lucas, Edmond Bauer, Henri Pieron and the physiologist Alexandre Monnier). He then participated to the works of the Centre d’études de la radio-télévision (directed by Jean Tardieu), and was a member of Pierre Schaeffer's team. But due to his financial precarity, he accepted two grants of the Rockefeller Foundation, in order to work at Columbia University (Music Department headed by Vladimir Ussachevsky).

In 1954, he defended a second PhD, in philosophy, under the title  "La création scientifique", under the direction of Bachelard.

From 1954 to 1960, Abraham Moles was the director of the Laboratoire d’électroacoustique Scherchen, in Gravesano, Switzerland. It was directed by Hermann Scherchen, one of the pioneers of Radio Berlin, who had discovered composers as famous as Luciano Berio, Iannis Xenakis, Bruno Maderna, Luigi Nono. At the same time, Abraham Moles was teaching at the University of Stuttgart (with Max Bense), of Bonn, of Berlin and of Utrecht. He was finally appointed as a full professor at the Ulm School of Design.

After 1966, he taught in Strasbourg (in the department created by Henri Lefebvre), first in sociology, then in social psychology. He created there an Institute for social psychology of communications, usually called École de Strasbourg. He developed an article "Art et ordinateur" (1970) into the book Art et ordinateur (1971). transposing the theories of Shannon to aesthetics.

His 1973 book, Théorie de l'information et perception esthétique (Information Theory and Esthetic Perception) expanded on his 1952 PhD work with music to show how an aesthetic work such as a piece of composed music was structurally made up of nested and increasingly fine sub-components which, upon auditioning, are then grouped perceptually to make a whole phrase, passage and composition. His work of this period was influential in that it allowed a link to be made between physicalist and semiotic approaches to information theory.

He is a founding member of L’Académie nationale des arts de la rue (ANAR) created in 1975 with Marcel Bleustein-Blanchet, Jacques Dauphin, Paul Delouvrier, Georges Elgozy, Roger Excoffon, Maurice Cazeneuve, and André Parinaud.

He was the president of the French Society of Cybernetics, founded by Louis Couffignal.

Selected work 

 Physique et technique du bruit, Paris, Dunod, 1952
 La Création scientifique, Genève, Kister, 1957
 Musiques expérimentales, Zurich, Cercle d'art, 1961
 Communications et langages, (en collaboration avec B. Vallancien), Paris, Gauthier-Villars, 1963
 Phonétique et phonation, (en collaboration avec B. Vallancien) Paris, Masson, 1966
 L'affiche dans la société urbaine, Paris, Dunod, 1969
 Créativité et méthodes d'innovation, Paris, Fayard, 1970
 Art et ordinateur, Paris, Casterman, 1971
 Psychologie du Kitsch, Paris, Denoël, 1971
 Théorie des objets, Paris, Ed. Universitaires, 1972
 Psychologie de l'espace, (En collaboration avec Élisabeth Rohmer), Paris, Casterman, 1972
 Théorie de l'information et perception esthétique, Paris, Denoël, 1973 (Information Theory and aesthetical perception)
 Sociodynamique de la culture, Paris, Mouton, 1973
 La Communication, Paris, Marabout, 1973
 Micropsychologie et vie quotidienne, (En collaboration avec Élisabeth Rohmer), Paris, Denoël, 1976
 Théorie des actes, (En collaboration avec Élisabeth Rohmer), Paris, Casterman, 1977
 L'image, communication fonctionnelle, Paris, Casterman, 1981
 Labyrinthes du vécu, Paris, Klincksieck, 1982
 Théorie structurale de la communication et société, Paris, Masson, 1986
 Les sciences de l'imprécis, (En collaboration avec Élisabeth Rohmer), Paris, Seuil, 1990
 Psychosociologie de l'espace, (En collaboration avec Élisabeth Rohmer), textes rassemblés, mis en forme et présentés par Victor Schwach, Paris, L'Harmattan, 1998

External links
  Abraham Moles at the Association Internationale de Micropsychologie et de Psychologie Sociale des Communications
  Abraham Moles: List of articles
 Google Scholar: Numerous scientific articles referencing the work of Moles
 Notices d'autorité : Fichier d’autorité international virtuel • International Standard Name Identifier • Bibliothèque nationale de France (données) • Système universitaire de documentation • Bibliothèque du Congrès • Gemeinsame Normdatei • Bibliothèque royale des Pays-Bas • Bibliothèque nationale de Catalogne • WorldCat
 (fr) Association internationale de micropsychologie et de psychologie sociale des communications  [archive]
 (fr) Liste des articles inédits d'Abraham Moles [archive]
 Abraham Moles & Élisabeth Rohmer, 1996. « Le cursus scientifique d'Abraham Moles. Autobiographie » [archive]. Bulletin de micropsychologie, nº 28.
 Michel Mathien & Victor Schwach, 1992. « De l'ingénieur à l'humaniste : l'œuvre d'Abraham Moles » [archive]. Communication et langages, nº 93, p. 84-98.

 Online texts 
 1992. « Vilem Flusser, un philosophe des Sudètes » [archive]. Communication et langages, nº91, p. 112-114.
 1990 (avec Claude Lefèvre). El paisaje urbano como fuente de conocimiento [archive] (Le paysage urbain comme source de connaissances). Barcelona : Paidós.
 1989. « Una novedad museográfica : El Museo de Antropología de Xalapa » [archive]. Graffiti, nº1
 1988. « Dire le monde et le transcrire » [archive].Communication et langages, nº76, p. 68-77.
 1988. « El concepte funcionalista del Bauhaus en la societat del miracle econòmic, la Hochschule für Gestaltung d'Ulm 1 » [archive]. Temes de disseny, ISSN 0213-6023, nº2 (« Diseño, Comunicación, Cultura »)
 1986. « Livre simple, livre complexe, où se situe la fonction éditoriale ? » [archive]. Communication et langages, nº67, p. 89-104.
 1980. « Le livre et les éditeurs » [archive]. Communication et langages, nº45, p. 82-96.
 1979. « Quelques axiomes communicationnels de la société de masse » [archive].Communication et langages, nº41-42, p. 170-171.
 1979. « Petite analyse du contenu des articles de Communication et langages » [archive]. Communication et langages, nº41-42, p. 7-9.
 1978. « Biblioteca pessoal ; biblioteca universal » [archive]. Revista de Biblioteconomia de Brasília, Vol. 6, nº1.
 1978. « Structuralisme et miniature persane » [archive]. Communication et langages, nº40, p. 7-13.
 1978. « Du sein féminin ». Senologia, vol. 3, nº2, p. 35-37
 1978. « L'image et le texte » [archive]. Communication et langages, nº38, p. 17-29.
 1972. « Notes pour une typologie des événements » [archive]. Communications, nº18 (« L'événement »), p. 90-96.
 1971. « Qu'est-ce que le Kitsch ? » [archive]. Communication et langages, nº9, 1971. p. 74-87.
 1970. « Art et ordinateur » [archive]. Communication et langages, nº7, p. 24-33.
 1969. « Sociodynamique et politique d'équipement culturel dans la société urbaine » [archive]. Communications, nº14 (« La politique culturelle »), p. 137-149.
 1969. « La situation sociale de l'affiche » [archive]. Communication et langages, nº4, p. 73-82.
 1969. « Objet et communication » [archive]. Communications, nº13 (« Les objets »), p. 1-21.
 1969. « Théorie de la complexité et civilisation industrielle » [archive]. Communications, nº13 (« Les objets »), p. 51-63.
 1969. « Kitsch et objet » [archive]. Communications, nº13 (« Les objets »), p. 105-129.
 1966. « La radio-télévision au service de la promotion socio-culturelle » [archive]. Communications, nº7 (« Radio-télévision : réflexions et recherches »). p. 1-10.
 1966. « Liberté principale, liberté marginale, liberté interstitielle » [archive]. Revue française de sociologie, vol. 7, nº2. p. 229-232.
 1965. « Produkte: ihre funktionelle und strukturelle Komplexität » [archive]. Allgemeine Designtheorie. paru en 1961 en français « La notion de quantité en cybernétique ». Les études philosophiques. Nº2 (avril-juin).

 Conference 
 1986. « L'expérience du Bauhaus après la Deuxième Guerre Mondiale: l'École d'Ulm » [archive]. Conférence donnée à la VIIe Setmana Cultural de l'ETSAB (10-13 février 1986). Malgré les problèmes techniques. En français, avec traduction espagnole.

 Other works 
 1952. Physique et technique du bruit, Paris, Dunod
 1957. La création scientifique, Genève, Kister
 1961. Musiques expérimentales, Zurich, Cercle d'art
 1963. Communications et langages (en collaboration avec B. Vallancien), Paris, Gauthier-Villars
 1966. Phonétique et phonation (en collaboration avec B. Vallancien) Paris, Masson
 1969. L'affiche dans la société urbaine, Paris, Dunod
 1970. Créativité et méthodes d'innovation, Paris, Fayard
 1971. Art et ordinateur, Paris, Casterman
 1971. La communication, Les dictionnaires du savoir moderne (ouvrage collectif sous la direccion d'Abraham Moles et Claude Zeltmann), Paris
 1972. Théorie des objets, Paris, Éditions universitaires
 1972. Psychologie de l'espace (en collaboration avec Élisabeth Rohmer), Paris, Casterman
 1973. Théorie de l'information et perception esthétique, Paris, Denoël
 1973. Sociodynamique de la culture, Paris, Mouton
 1973. La communication, Paris, Marabout
 1976. Micropsychologie et vie quotidienne (en collaboration avec Élisabeth Rohmer), Paris, Denoël
 1977. Théorie des actes (en collaboration avec Élisabeth Rohmer), Paris, Casterman
 1981. L'image, communication fonctionnelle, Paris, Casterman
 1982. Labyrinthes du vécu, Paris, Klincksieck
 1986. Théorie structurale de la communication et société, Paris, Masson 1990. Les sciences de l'imprécis (en collaboration avec Élisabeth Rohmer), Paris, Seuil
 1998. Psychosociologie de l'espace (en collaboration avec Élisabeth Rohmer), textes rassemblés, mis en forme et présentés par Victor Schwach, Paris, L'Harmattan

 Notes and references 
 ↑ Notice d'autorité personne [archive] sur le site du catalogue général de la BnF
 ↑ Cf. Martial Robert, 1999, p. 138. Pierre Schaeffer, des transmissions à Orphée''. Paris, L'Harmattan, 416 p.
 ↑ https://web.archive.org/web/20150220050452/http://www.esprit68.org/misere.html [archive]
 ↑ catalogue.bibliothequedesociologie.cnrs.fr [archive]

References

20th-century French engineers
1920 births
1992 deaths
French non-fiction writers
French male non-fiction writers
20th-century non-fiction writers
Cyberneticists
Philosophers of technology
20th-century French male writers
20th-century French inventors